IBM Security Directory Server, formerly known as IBM Directory Server and IBM Tivoli Directory Server, is an IBM implementation of the Lightweight Directory Access Protocol

IBM Security Directory Server is an enterprise directory for corporate intranets and the Internet. IBM Security Directory Server is built to serve as the identity data foundation for rapid development and deployment of Web applications and security and identity management initiatives by including strong management, replication and security features.

IBM Security Directory Server supports digital certificate-based authentication, the Simple Authentication and Security Layer (SASL), Challenge-Response Authentication Mechanism MD5 (CRAM-MD5), and Kerberos authentication.

History 
During its inception, IBM named its product the IBM SecureWay Directory. This name wasn't changed until the Release 5.1 of the product and was then known as IBM Directory Server. With the next version of the product, Release 5.2, the name was again changed to include the Tivoli in it, and was known as IBM Tivoli Directory Server. The latest release offered as of Mar 2014 is IBM Security Directory Server.

Features 

 Supports millions of entries by leveraging advanced reliability and scalability of IBM Db2 technology and built-in proxy server
 Extends an on-demand identity infrastructure to leading business solutions through compliance with LDAP
 Maintains high availability using robust master/subordinate and peer-to-peer replication capabilities, with up to dozens of master servers
 Integrates with IBM middleware, identity management, and security products, plus leverage open integration with non-IBM offerings
 Offers end users Web-based access to, and the ability to update, “white pages” information
 Flexibly supports leading platforms, including IBM AIX, Sun Solaris, Microsoft Windows Server, HP-UX, and SUSE and Red Hat Linux distributions
 Remote administration of the server through an extensive web-based interface

See also 
 List of LDAP software

References

External links 
 IBM Security Directory Server homepage
 IBM Security Directory Server information center
 IBM Software Downloads

Tivoli Directory Server
Directory services